Sheldon R. Pinnell (c. 1937 - 4 July 2013) was an American dermatologist and physician-scientist who served as the J. Lamar Callaway Professor of Dermatology at Duke University. His research involves sun protection, photoaging, collagen chemistry, and topical percutaneous absorption of antioxidants. In 2013, he was made an honorary member of the Society of Investigative Dermatology.

He was the founder of SkinCeuticals.

Education
Pinnell earned his BA degree in chemistry from Duke University and his MD degree from Yale University. He conducted a residency at the University of Minnesota Medical School and dermatology residencies at Harvard University and Massachusetts General Hospital.

References 

Yale School of Medicine alumni
2013 deaths
Duke University Trinity College of Arts and Sciences alumni
Duke University School of Medicine faculty
American dermatologists
Year of birth missing
20th-century American physicians
21st-century American physicians
Physician-scientists
American medical researchers
1930s births